The following Confederate States Army units and commanders fought in the Battle of Chickamauga of the American Civil War. The Union order of battle is listed separately. Order of battle compiled from the army organization during the campaign.

Abbreviations used

Military rank 
 Gen = General
 LTG = Lieutenant General
 MG = Major General
 BG = Brigadier General
 Col = Colonel
 Ltc = Lieutenant Colonel
 Maj = Major
 Cpt = Captain
 Lt = Lieutenant

Other
 w = wounded
 mw = mortally wounded
 k = killed
 c = captured

Army of Tennessee (September 19, 1863)
Gen Braxton Bragg, Commanding

Escort: Cpt Guy Dreux

 Dreux's Company, Louisiana Cavalry: Lt O. De Buis
 Holloway's Company,  Alabama Cavalry: Cpt E. M. Holloway

Polk's Corps

LTG Leonidas Polk

Escort:
 Greenleaf's Company, Louisiana Cavalry: Cpt Leeds Greenleaf (Corps headquarters)
 Company G, 2nd Georgia Cavalry: Cpt Thomas M. Merritt (Cheatham's Division)
 Lenoir's Company, Alabama Cavalry: Cpt T.M. Lenoir (Hindman's Division)

Hill's Corps
LTG Daniel H. Hill

Escort:
 Sanders' Company Tennessee Cavalry: Cpt C. F. Sanders (Cleburne's Division)
 Foules' Company, Mississippi Cavalry: Cpt H. L. Foules (Breckinridge's Division)

Buckner's Corps

MG Simon Bolivar Buckner, Sr.

Escort:
 Clark's Company, Tennessee Cavalry: Cpt J. W. Clark (Corps headquarters)

Reserve Corps
MG William H. T. Walker

Longstreet's Corps

MG John B. Hood

Reserve Artillery

Wheeler's Cavalry Corps
MG Joseph Wheeler

Forrest's Cavalry Corps

BG Nathan B. Forrest

Escort:
 Jackson's Company, Tennessee Cavalry: Cpt J. C. Jackson (Corps headquarters)

Army of Tennessee (September 20, 1863)
Gen Braxton Bragg, Commanding

Escort: Cpt Guy Dreux

 Dreux's Company, Louisiana Cavalry: Lt O. De Buis
 Holloway's Company,  Alabama Cavalry: Cpt E. M. Holloway

Right Wing
LTG Leonidas Polk

Escort:
 Greenleaf's Company, Louisiana Cavalry: Cpt Leeds Greenleaf

Cheatham's Division

Escort:
 Company G, 2nd Georgia Cavalry: Cpt Thomas M. Merritt

Hill's Corps
LTG Daniel H. Hill

Escort:
 Sanders' Company Tennessee Cavalry: Cpt C. F. Sanders (Cleburne's Division)
 Foules' Company, Mississippi Cavalry: Cpt H. L. Foules (Breckinridge's Division)

Reserve Corps
MG William H. T. Walker

Left Wing
LTG James Longstreet

Hindman's Division

Escort:
 Lenoir's Company, Alabama Cavalry: Cpt T.M. Lenoir

Buckner's Corps

MG Simon Bolivar Buckner, Sr.

Escort:
 Clark's Company, Tennessee Cavalry: Cpt J. W. Clark (Corps headquarters)

Longstreet's Corps

MG John B. Hood (w)

Reserve Artillery

Cavalry

Wheeler's Corps
MG Joseph Wheeler

Forrest's Cavalry Corps

BG Nathan B. Forrest

Escort:
 Jackson's Company, Tennessee Cavalry: Cpt J. C. Jackson (Corps headquarters)

Notes

References

 U.S. War Department, The War of the Rebellion: a Compilation of the Official Records of the Union and Confederate Armies, U.S. Government Printing Office, 1880–1901.
 Civil War Home: The Chickamauga Campaign. Confederate Order of Battle 
 Confederate Chickamauga Order of Battle at Civil War Virtual Tours

American Civil War orders of battle
Confederate Order Of Battle
Braxton Bragg
James Longstreet
Leonidas Polk